The Kenya Film Commission  (KFC) was established by the Kenyan government in 2005. It came into full function in mid-2006.
The Kenya Film Commission was formed with the aim of promoting the Kenyan film industry locally as well as internationally. 
International film-makers looking to film in Kenya are offered detailed information on locations by the commission, as well as liaison services on behalf of the government, advice on reconnaissance's, film licensing and immigration, and facilitation of the filming process.

Structure 
The Kenya Film Commission was under the ministry of Sports, Culture and the Arts since its inception in 2005 until 2019 when it was moved to the ministry of ICT, Innovation and Youth affairs. The board is appointed by the minister. Board members are Chris Foot (board chair), Judy Bisem, Njoki Muhoho, Julius Lamaon, Michael Onyango, Mwaniki Mageria and Felix Mugabe.

Functions 

The Kenya Film Commission supports the Kenyan film industry by providing facilities for screenings and filming, as well as organising various educational workshops on production for local film-makers. The commission is also establishing a database that will list filmmakers, agents, local talent, stakeholders and service providers of the Kenyan film industry. The Kenya Film Commission is a member of the Association of Film Commissions International.

Recent productions 
Nowhere in Africa
The Constant Gardener
Tomb Raider II
Good Morning America / ABC – live 2 hour broadcast “Seven Modern Wonders of the World”
The Amazing Race
Survivor Season 3
Kibera Kid
SlumDogg

References

External links 
Kenya Film Commission
Film Licensing Officer'''

Film
Film commissions
2005 establishments in Kenya
Organizations established in 2005
Film organisations in Kenya